Bissetia is a genus of moths of the family Crambidae.

Species
Bissetia leucomeralis (Hampson, 1919)
Bissetia poliella (Hampson, 1919)
Bissetia steniellus (Hampson, 1899)
Bissetia subfumalis (Hampson, 1896)
Bissetia tauromma (Kapur, 1950)

References

Haimbachiini
Crambidae genera